This is a list of geographic names from ancient times in the current Republic of Croatia with modern names. Some of the current names refer to places that are only nearby. These include Illyrian, Ancient Greek, and Roman names.

Regions

Towns

Rivers and streams

Populated islands

See also
List of ancient cities in Illyria

References

Sources

External links
Dawn of Recorded History
Illyricum at Antonio Sciarretta's Toponymy
Posljedna faza osvajanja južne Panonije Bellum Pannonicum (12.–11. PR. KR.) 
Brill Online reference works
Digital Map of the Roman Empire

Croatia geography-related lists
Croatia history-related lists
Geographic names

Names of places in Croatia